Septotheca is a genus of trees in the family Malvaceae. It contains a single species Septotheca tessmannii, native to Peru, Colombia and Brazil.

References

Malvaceae genera
Bombacoideae
Trees of Peru
Trees of Colombia
Trees of Brazil
Monotypic Malvales genera